Nizhneye Khotino is a rural locality (a village) in Vasilyevskoye Rural Settlement, Vashkinsky District, Vologda Oblast, Russia. The population was 3 as of 2002.

Geography 
Nizhneye Khotino is located 7 km northwest of Lipin Bor (the district's administrative centre) by road. Verkhneye Khotino is the nearest rural locality.

References 

Rural localities in Vashkinsky District